VAT was introduced very beginning in year on year value added tax (VAT) into the Indian taxation system from 1 April 2005. The existing general rules and citations very usefulsales tax laws were replaced with the Value Added Tax Act (2005) and associated VAT rules.

A few states (Gujarat, Tamil Nadu, Rajasthan, Madhya Pradesh, Chhattisgarh, Jharkhand, Uttarakhand and Uttar Pradesh) opted to stay out of VAT taxation system during the initial introduction of VAT but adopted it later.

As of 2 June 2014, VAT has been implemented in all the states and union territories of India except Pondicherry, Andaman and Nicobar Islands and Lakshadweep Island.

History 
The OECD (2008, 112–13) cites Chanchal Kumar Sharma (2005) to answer why it has proved so difficult to implement a federal VAT in India. The book claims that although the implementation of a broad-based federal VAT was considered as the most desirable consumption tax for India since the early 1990s, such a reform would involve serious problems for the finances of regional governments. Also, implementing VAT in India during the current economic reforms would have paradoxical dimensions for Indian federalism. On one hand, economic reforms have led to decentralization of expenditure responsibilities, which, in turn, demands more decentralization of revenue raising power if fiscal accountability is to be maintained. On the other hand, implementing the VAT, to make India a single integrated market, would lead to revenue losses for the states and reduce their autonomy indicating greater centralization

Sharma asserts that "political compulsions have led the government to propose an imperfect model of VAT", as it 'goes against the basic premise of VAT', as it lacks both the removal of distortions in movement of goods across states and the uniformity in the tax structure. Chanchal Kumar Sharma (2005:929) states, "Local or state level taxes like octroi, entry tax, lease tax, workers contract tax, entertainment tax and luxury tax are not integrated into the new regime, which goes against the basic premise of VAT, which is to have uniformity in the tax structure. The fact that no tax credit will be allowed for inter-state trade seriously undermines the basic benefit of enforcing a VAT system, namely the removal of the distortions in movement of goods across the states."

Sharma (2021) details the process by which the consensus on contentious issues related to the GST, which had eluded the centre and states since the beginning of economic reforms in the 1990s, was finally achieved with the constitution of the GST Council (GSTC) in 2016. He argues that the consensus resulted from a combination of two factors– namely, the presence of an economic paradigm that supported the GST reform and a dominant party system, whereby the dominant national ruling party could forge a political consensus to implement the GST. Sharma (2021) explains at length the implications of the GST regime for India's federal system.

States where VAT is applicable

Gujarat
The Government of Gujarat had pass the "Gujarat Value Added Tax Act, 2003" (Act)
in 2003 and specified that the date of implementation (appointed date) of the same would be notified later. Accordingly, the Government of Gujarat has vide notification no. GHN – 14/VAT-2006/S.1.(3)(1)-TH dated 29 March 2006 notified that the appointed date for implementation of VAT regulations in the State of Gujarat shall be effected from 1 April 2006.

However "The Central Sales Tax Act, 1956" (Central Act) which levies sales tax on inter-state sales is still effective and all inter state sale and purchase transactions effected after 1 April 2006 in the State of Gujarat shall continue to be subject to levy central sales tax as applicable earlier.

In Gujarat, "DVAT" Act 2003, will merge three existing state taxes:
Gujarat Sales Tax Act, 1956 
Bombay Sales of Motor Spirit Taxation Act, 1958
Gujarat Purchase Tax on Sugarcane Act, 1989

Rates under VAT:

The Gujarat Value Added Tax Act, 2003 - Schedule

Maharashtra
The system of Value Added Tax (VAT) has been implemented, in the State of Maharashtra, w.e.f. 1 April 2005. Every dealer, who becomes liable to pay tax under the provisions of MVAT, shall apply electronically for registration, within 30 days from the date of such liability. VAT is implemented by Department of Sales Tax. Their site address is: Department Of Sales Tax - Govt. of Maharashtra

Rate of tax: 
Schedule ‘A’ – Essential Commodities (Tax free) - Nil
Schedule ‘B’ – Gold, Silver, Precious Stones, Pearls etc. - 1.2%
Schedule ‘C' – Declared Goods and other specified verry goods - 6% (Rates for items other than declared goods changed to 6%)
Schedule ‘D’ – Foreign Liquor, Country Liquor, Motor Spirits, etc. - 20% and above
Schedule ‘E’ – All other goods (not covered by A to D) - 13.5% with EFF CT from 17.09.2016

Delhi
DVAT 2004 as amended by DVAT 2005 and DVAT Rules 2005 came into force w.e.f. 1 April.,2005. It repealed Delhi Sales Tax Act 1975, Delhi Sales Tax on Works Contract Act, 1999, Delhi Sales Tax on Transfer to Right to use Goods Act 2002 and Delhi Tax on Entry of Motors Vehicles into Local Areas Act 1994.
 Value-added tax depends on the product and services.

Jammu & Kashmir
Value added tax for the state Jammu & Kashmir includes multiple products such as cooked food, saffron, honey, electrical items, textile items such as durries, quilts, Pashmina wool etc. Apart from the applicability of VAT, the govt also made some exemptions on basic food items, industrial units, hotel, and farming equipment.

Kerala

The Kerala Value Added Tax Act (KVAT) 2003 was the governing act for Value Added Taxes in Kerala. Kerala Value Added Tax (Act 30 of 2004) came into force on 1 April 2005.

See also 
 Assam General Sales Tax
 One Hundred and First Amendment of the Constitution of India
 Taxation in India

References

External links
 Department of Revenue, Ministry of Finance, Government of India

India
Taxation in India